Fartein is a given name. Notable people with the name include:

 Fartein Døvle Jonassen (born 1971), Norwegian novelist and translator
 Fartein Valen (1887–1952), Norwegian composer
 Fartein Valen-Sendstad (1918–1984), Norwegian historian

Scandinavian masculine given names